Volleyball events were contested at the 1981 Summer Universiade in Bucharest, Romania.

References
 Universiade volleyball medalists on HickokSports

U
1981 Summer Universiade
Volleyball at the Summer Universiade